The 2003 Advanta Championships was a tennis tournament played on indoor hard courts at The Pavilion in Villanova, Philadelphia, Pennsylvania in the United States that was part of Tier II of the 2003 WTA Tour. It was the 19th edition of the tournament and was held from October 27 through November 2, 2003. Second-seeded Amélie Mauresmo won the singles title and earned $93,000 first-prize money.

Finals

Singles

 Amélie Mauresmo defeated  Anastasia Myskina 5–7, 6–0, 6–2
 It was Mauresmo's 2nd singles title of the year and the 10th of her career.

Doubles

 Martina Navratilova /  Lisa Raymond defeated  Cara Black /  Rennae Stubbs 6–3, 6–4

References

External links
 ITF tournament edition details
 Tournament draws

Advanta Championships of Philadelphia
Advanta Championships of Philadelphia
Advanta Championships
Advanta Championships
Advanta Championships
Advanta Championships